David Bacon is a photojournalist, author, political activist, and union organizer who has focused on labor issues, particularly those related to immigrant labor.  He has written several books and numerous articles on the subject.

Bacon's parents were strong supporter of unionism and his early interest in labor issues began with union organizing activities. He was involved in organizing efforts for the United Farm Workers, the United Electrical Workers, the International Ladies' Garment Workers' Union, the Molders' Union and others.

Books 
 The children of NAFTA : labor wars on the U.S./Mexico border	2003
 (translated by Gemma Galdon as Hijos del libre comercio)	2005

 Communities without borders : images and voices from the world of migration	2006
 Illegal people : how globalization creates migration and criminalizes immigrants	2008
 The right to stay home : how US policy drives Mexican migration	2013
 (translated as El derecho a quedarse en casa cómo las politícas de Estados Unidos influyen en la migración mexicana)	2013
 In the Fields of the North / En los campos del norte  (2017)
 More Than a Wall / Más que un muro (2022)

Exhibitions and articles  (partial list) 

 Every worker is an organizer : Farm labor and the resurgence of the United Farm Workers. WorkingUSA.Volume 2, Issue 6, pages 67–76, March–April 1999.	1999
 David Bacon, Fotografien: IG Metall-Galerie Frankfurt am Main, [13. März bis 28. April 2000]	2000
 Christmas at Woodfin Suites: When Woodfin Suites fired its immigrant workers, was it obeying the law or dodging a living-wage ordinance? East Bay Express, 24 Jan 2007.	2007
 Immigration and the Culture of Solidarity in Globalization and Migration (AFSC). Pages 58–66.	2008
 Uprooted and Criminalized: The Impact of Free Markets on Migrants in Globalization and Migration (AFSC). Pages 69–91.	2008
 Displaced, unequal and criminalized : fighting for the rights of migrants in the United States	2011
 Living on the Streets of Oakland East Bay Express. August 6, 2014. 	
 ‘You Came Here to Suffer’ The Progressive. June 1, 2018

References

External links 

 The Reality Check: Stories and Photographs by David Bacon

1948 births
Living people
American photojournalists
American activist journalists
Trade unionists from California
United Electrical, Radio and Machine Workers of America people